Bostanu (also Romanized as Bostānū, Bestanoo, and Bustānu) is a village in Chah-e Mobarak Rural District, Chah-e Mobarak District, Asaluyeh County, Bushehr Province, Iran. At the 2006 census, its population was 969, in 171 families.

References 

Populated places in Asaluyeh County